La Leche River, meaning the milky one, is a river of Lambayeque Region in northwestern Peru, although some of its water come from the northern Cajamarca Region.

Its two main tributaries are the Moyán and the Sangana rivers, both right-hand tributaries. During the rainy season, mid November to mid April, but especially during El Niño events, La Leche can experience severe flooding, and in some years by the end of the dry season it can almost disappear. Traditionally stone levees were used to try to control the flooding, but in the 21st century upland dams are being used.

The valley of La Leche is variously forested, grassland and agricultural. The largest town along La Leche is Incahuasi. Both the Laquipampa Wildlife Refuge and the Pómac Forest Historical Sanctuary are along La Leche.

Notes and references

Further reading
 

Rivers of Peru